Deloraine Airport  is located  south of Deloraine, Manitoba, Canada.

References

External links
Page about this airport on COPA's Places to Fly airport directory

Registered aerodromes in Manitoba